The Men's aerials competition at the FIS Freestyle Ski and Snowboarding World Championships 2023 was held on 23 February 2023.

Qualification
The qualification was started on 23 February at 10:00.

Final
The first run was started at 12:50 and the second run at 13:26.

References

Men's aerials